Berkin Usta (born 29 May 2000) is a Turkish male Olympian alpine skier.

Early years
Berkin Usta was born in Bursa, Turkey on 29 May 2000. His father Yahya Usta was a national alpine skier. He began skiing at age of only two and half.

He studies  International Trade and Business at Istanbul Bilgi University.

Sports career
Usta performs alpine skiing, and is a member of 16 Sports Club" in his hometown. 

He participated in the grand slalom event of the 2017 European Youth Olympic Winter Festival in Erzurum, Turkey, and ranked 21st.

He competes at the 2022 Winter Olympics in Beijing, China.

See also
 Turkey at the 2017 European Youth Olympic Winter Festival
 Turkey at the 2022 Winter Olympics

References

2000 births
Living people
Sportspeople from Bursa
Istanbul Bilgi University alumni
Turkish male alpine skiers
Olympic alpine skiers of Turkey
Alpine skiers at the 2022 Winter Olympics
21st-century Turkish people